Kevin Seabury (born 24 November 1973, in Shrewsbury) is an English former professional footballer, who most notably played for his home-town club Shrewsbury Town.

After leaving school, Seabury joined Shrewsbury Town, and was offered a professional contract at the start of the 1992/93 season.
Seabury was to stay with Shrewsbury for just under 10 years, making 206 league starts and scoring 9 league goals. In total he made 258 appearances in a Shrewsbury shirt (including cup games).

In January 2002, Seabury transferred to Dover Athletic, where he made 15 appearances during the second half of the 2001/02 season, scoring 2 goals. He was to move to Welling United in July 2002 and captained the side during his stay there. After two seasons at Welling, Seabury had short stays at Hednesford Town and Bridgnorth Town before retiring from senior football in 2004.

References

External links

1974 births
Living people
Sportspeople from Shrewsbury
English footballers
English Football League players
Shrewsbury Town F.C. players
Dover Athletic F.C. players
Hednesford Town F.C. players
Welling United F.C. players
Bridgnorth Town F.C. players
People educated at The Priory School, Shrewsbury
Association football defenders